Kandahar is a classic World Cup downhill ski course in southern Germany. Located in Bavaria at the Garmisch Classic ski area on the Zugspitze above Garmisch-Partenkirchen, it opened  in 1936.

In 2009, the new "Kandahar 2" men's course opened, parallel to the original, which became "Kandahar 1". With a maximum incline of 42.6° degrees (92%), it has the second steepest gradient on the World Cup circuit.

Since 1954, the Arlberg-Kandahar races have been held here, rotating with other notable downhill courses in Austria, Switzerland, France, and Italy.

Courses
The course was named after Sir Frederick Roberts, a British Victorian era major general known as "Baron of Kandahar", who led the Kabul Field Force in the Second Anglo-Afghan War and defeated Ayub Khan at the Battle of Kandahar. The Kandahar Ski Club of Mürren, Switzerland, was founded by Arnold Lunn and other British skiers in early 1924.

Kandahar 1
"Kandahar 1" (before just "Kandahar") is the original course built for the Olympic debut of alpine skiing in 1936, and is now used only for women's speed events. After the "Schußanger" with two curves, "Himmelreich" jump follows where the Super-G start is located, then "Bödele". Then comes the "Waldeck" with 85% gradient, the steepest section in women's circuit and a technically very demending traverse. From 2009, course from there continues by newly built route where also giant slalom starts; the "Eishang" is bypassed by via the "Ramwiesen" and via the "Höllentor" it returns to the original Kandahar in "Hölle", the steep section. Then passing the "FIS Schneise", a sloping run that, after a hard left-hand bend, ends in the men's course just before the "Tauber-Schuss".

Kandahar 2
Is the almost complete new downhill run for men, only with the same start and finish of the original Kandahar. After the "Tröglhang", the steepest section until 2008, the course continues into newly built route in 2009 to "Olympia-Kurve" and then to "Panorama-Sprung". After that comes the "Alte Quelle", before the route at the "Bödele" returns into the original Kandahar to the start of the giant slalom above "Eishang" and after the cable car jump, the racers turn right into the second newly designed part at the "Kramersprung". Then to the next newly section called "Padöls" and into "Auf der Mauer" flat passage. Next is "Frei Fall", with 92% incline, the absolute steepest section in this competition. At the end, last couple of hundred metres, routes joins with the old original course into the "Tauber-Schuss" and a  jump just before the finish line.

Olympics

Men's events

Women's events

World Championships

Men's events

Women's events

Team event

World Cup 
The World Cup circuit debuted in January 1967.

Men

Women

Sections

Kandahar 1 (W)
Tröglhang, Schussanger, Himmelreich, Bödele, Eishang, Seilbahn Stadl, Waldeck, Ramwiesen, Höllentor, Hölle, FIS Schneise, Tauber-Schuss

Kandahar 2 (M)
Tröglhang, Olimpiakurve, Panorama-Sprung, Stegerwald, Alte Quelle, Eishang, Kramarsprung, Padöls, Auf der Mauer, Frei Fall, Tauber-Schuss

Fatal accidents 
On 29 January 1994, Austrian ski racer Ulrike Maier suffered fatal injuries at "FIS Schneise" section crashing into intermediate timing device at  during the World Cup downhill event. A week before, she won a giant slalom in Maribor.

Thirty-five years earlier in 1959, Canadian John Semmelink crashed into a rock-filled gully and later succumbed to his injuries. Held on an icy course on 7 February in challenging conditions of fog and flat light, Semmerlink was the 44th racer on the course. At a lower section named Himmelreich (heaven) just  from the finish, witnesses said one of his bindings opened and he crashed into a rock-filled gully. Semmerlink had a serious head injury and was taken by U.S. Army helicopter to a nearby U.S. military dispensary, but died of his injuries. Of the 89 starters, 39 did not finish the race.

Club5+ 
In 1986, elite Club5 was originally founded by prestigious classic downhill organizers: Kitzbühel, Wengen, Garmisch, Val d’Isère and Val Gardena/Gröden, with goal to bring alpine ski sport on the highest levels possible.

Later over the years other classic longterm organizers joined the now named Club5+: Alta Badia, Cortina, Kranjska Gora, Maribor, Lake Louise, Schladming, Adelboden, Kvitfjell, St.Moritz and Åre.

References

External links
zugspitze.de course official site
FIS Alpine Ski World Cup – Garmisch, Germany 
Ski-db.com - Garmisch men's races
Ski-db.com - Garmisch women's races

Skiing in Germany